Addiewell railway station is a railway station serving Addiewell in West Lothian, Scotland.

History 

Opened by the Caledonian Railway in July 1882 (several years after the line itself), it became part of the London, Midland and Scottish Railway during the Grouping of 1923. The line then passed on to the Scottish Region of British Railways on nationalisation in 1948.

When sectorisation was introduced, the station was served by ScotRail until the Privatisation of British Rail.

Service 
Monday to Saturday sees an hourly service to Edinburgh and Glasgow serving most intermediate stations, this drops to 2-hourly in the evening. There is one service a day to and from Motherwell.

Sundays see a 2-hourly service in both directions, not calling at Breich or Cambuslang.

Notes

References 

 
 
 
 Station on navigable O.S. map

External links 

 Video footage of Addiewell railway station

Railway stations in West Lothian
Railway stations served by ScotRail
Railway stations in Great Britain opened in 1882
Former Caledonian Railway stations